The Kharkiv Cathedral Mosque, also known as Khavidrali Mosque,  is located in Kharkiv, Ukraine. The mosque was originally built in 1905, demolished by Soviet communists in 1936, and rebuilt in 2006.

History
In 1905, a mosque was built on the bank of the Lopan River. The mosque was destroyed by the Soviets in 1936 on claims that it hindered the flow of the river. In 1999 work began to rebuild the mosque at the same location.

Parishioners consist of Tatars, Crimean Tatars, and Turks.

See also

 Islam in Ukraine

References

External links

Mosques in Ukraine
Mosques completed in 1905
Buildings and structures demolished in 1936
Religious buildings and structures in Kharkiv
Mosques destroyed by communists
Closed mosques in the Soviet Union
Crimean Tatar culture
Turkish diaspora in Europe
Volga Tatars